B is the second letter of the Latin alphabet.

B may also refer to:

Science, technology, and mathematics

Astronomy
 Astronomical objects in the Barnard list of dark nebulae (abbreviation B)
 Latitude (b) in the galactic coordinate system

Biology and medicine
 Haplogroup B (mtDNA), a human mitochondrial DNA (mtDNA) haplogroup
 Haplogroup B (Y-DNA), a Y-chromosomal DNA (Y-DNA) haplogroup
 Blood type B
 ATC code B Blood and blood forming organs, a section of the Anatomical Therapeutic Chemical Classification System
 Vitamin B
 Hepatitis B
 Berlin Botanical Garden and Botanical Museum, assigned the abbreviation B as a repository of herbarium specimens

Computing
 B (programming language)
 B-Method, for computer software development
 B-tree, a data structure
 Bit (b)
 Byte (B)
 , an HTML element denoting bold text

Physical and chemical quantities and units
 One of the reciprocal lattice vectors (b*)
 Breadth (b); see length
 Impact parameter (b)
 Molality (b)
 Barn (unit) (b), a unit of area
 Magnetic field (B)
 Napierian absorbance (B)
 Rotational constant (B)
 Second virial coefficient (B)
 Susceptance (B)
 Bel (B), a logarithmic unit equal to ten decibels

Other uses in science, technology, and mathematics
 B, a modal logic
 bottom quark (symbol: b), an elementary particle
 B meson, a type of meson
 Boolean domain, in mathematics
 Boron, symbol B, a chemical element
 Bulb (photography), a shutter-speed setting
 B battery, a battery used to provide the plate voltage of a vacuum tube
 B horizon, a layer of soil commonly known as subsoil
 B, B+ and B−, expressions of buoyancy in convective available potential energy

Linguistics 
 В, a letter of the Cyrillic alphabet
 Voiced bilabial stop (b, in the International Phonetic Alphabet)

Arts and media

Music

Musical notation
 B (musical note)
 B major, a scale
 B minor, a scale
 B major chord, Chord names and symbols (popular music)
  Flat (music), a note lower in pitch by a semitone

Performers
 Beyoncé
 B, member of Superorganism (band)

Recordings
 B (BamBam EP), an extended play by BamBam
 B (Battles EP), an extended play by Battles
 B (I Am Kloot album), a compilation album by I Am Kloot
 b (Moxy Früvous EP), an extended play by Moxy Früvous
 "b", an Iamamiwhoami song
 "B", a song by Todrick Hall from his 2018 album Forbidden

Other media
 /b/, a board on 4chan
 b (newspaper), a free daily, tabloid sized newspaper, published by The Baltimore Sun
 Codex Vaticanus Graecus 1209, an ancient bible
 Rajawali Televisi, previously named B Channel, a television channel in Indonesia
 B, the production code for the 1963–64 Doctor Who serial The Daleks
 B, a character in Total Drama: Revenge of the Island
 "B" Is for Burglar, the second novel in Sue Grafton's "Alphabet mystery" series, published in 1985

Places
 Belgium, on the vehicle registration plates of the European Union
 Bucharest, on the vehicle registration plates of Romania

Sport
 Australian rules football positions#Full back, in Australian Rules football
 B, often used after the name of football clubs to denote a reserve team

Transportation
 B (New York City Subway service)
 B Line (Los Angeles Metro)
 Line B (Buenos Aires Metro)
 B (S-train), in Copenhagen
 RER B, a line in the RER of Paris
Bundesstraße (federal highway) in Austria and Germany (abbreviation B)
 Bayshore Route of Shuto Expressway in Japan, numbered as route B

Other uses
 B (grade), for evaluation of students' work
 B (bank), a banking brand in the United Kingdom
 Barnabites, a religious order abbreviated to the postnominal B.
 Bravo, the military time zone code for UTC+02:00
 Brutus, a Roman cognomen (abbreviation B)
 Farmall B, a tractor produced by International Harvester from 1939 to 1947
 Dominical letter B for a common year starting on Saturday

See also
 B postcode area (United Kingdom)
 B class (disambiguation)
 Class B (disambiguation)
 B1 (disambiguation)
 B2 (disambiguation)
 Be (disambiguation)
 Bea (disambiguation)
 Bee (disambiguation)
 Bet (disambiguation)
 Beta (disambiguation)
 BB (disambiguation)
 BBB (disambiguation)
 Plan B (disambiguation)